Loughmore, officially Loughmoe (or Luachma), is a village in County Tipperary, Ireland. The village is best known for Loughmoe Castle, seat of the Barons of Loughmoe.

It is one half of the parish of Loughmore-Castleiney in the Roman Catholic Archdiocese of Cashel and Emly. Loughmoe gives its name to the civil parish of Loughmoe West which is in the historical barony of Eliogarty.

Toponymy
The village's Irish-language name Luach Maigh (earlier: Luach-mhagh) means "reward-field". Today's Loughmore – which would correspond to Irish Loch Mór ("great lake") – is the result of a mistake made by British mapmakers of the 19th century. The Purcell family's Loughmoe Castle, near the village, retains a more accurate and older version of the name.

Certain localities in Ireland were given this name, probably because "in old times some tenant held them free of direct rent, as a reward for some signal service, or on condition of fulfilling some special duty". Local tradition has it that a king lived in the castle, and offered his daughter's hand to whoever could rid the land of a gigantic boar and sow that uprooted crops and killed anyone they met. A youth named Purcell killed the boar with a bow and arrow, and won the reward for himself and his descendants, and the area in which the Castle stands is known as "the field of the reward". The legend is alluded to in the Purcell family's coat of arms, which depicts the heads of four boars.

Geography
Loughmore is on the banks of the River Suir some 5.5 km south of Templemore, 10 km north of Thurles and a kilometre east of the main N62 road between those towns. Castleiney is some 5 km away and closer to Templemore. The parish is in the Golden Vale, one of the richest agricultural areas in Europe. Dairy farming and cattle raising are the principal occupations.

Transport
Loughmore lies on the Dublin – Cork railway line. The nearby Templemore railway station has direct trains to Cork, Dublin, Limerick and Tralee operated by Iarnród Éireann.

The N62 highway links Loughmore with the M8 motorway to Cork and the M7 to Dublin and Limerick.

Loughmore's central location puts it within 90 minutes' drive of three international airports: Cork, Dublin and Shannon.

History

Loughmore Castle

Loughmoe Castle was the seat of the Purcell family, who were Barons of Loughmoe. Construction of the castle began in 1328, the year that the family were granted the title of Barons of Loughmoe. Until the 1980s it was possible to climb the spiral stair in the right-hand tower. The monument is now in the care of the Office of Public Works.

The title Baron of Loughmoe is an Irish feudal barony, and was possibly raised to a Jacobite peerage in 1690 while King James II of England was in exile. The feudal title was first granted to Richard Purcell in 1328 by James Butler, 1st Earl of Ormond as palatine Lord of Tipperary. Irish and Scottish feudal titles, particularly those granted by palatine lords, are acknowledged as genuine hereditaments by the arms granting bodies of Ireland, Scotland, and England, but were never formally recognised by the British Crown.

Referring to the Purcells of Loughmoe specifically, the medieval Irish genealogist Dubhaltach Mac Fhirbhisigh wrote that Purcell genealogy begins with Charlemagne, Emperor of the Holy Roman Empire.

The Cormack Brothers

In 1858 in Loughmore, two local men, Daniel and William Cormack, were executed for the murder of John Ellis, a land agent from Kilrush, near Templemore, County Tipperary. Ellis was hated for evicting tenants on behalf of the landlords who employed him. One night as he returned along the lane to his isolated home, his way was blocked by uprooted bushes and branches. He was shot by a hidden assailant and died an hour later.

The police had no doubt that this was a political murder, because £90 in Ellis’s wallet was left untouched. The brothers William and Daniel Cormack were arrested and convicted at Nenagh Assizes in March 1858, largely, it was felt at the time, on the evidence of an informer – "a villainous character" – who was widely believed to have been part of the murder plot. The judge was the notoriously corrupt and harsh William Keogh.

The common belief was that a local landlord had shot Ellis in a crime of passion involving Ellis' sister, and that the Cormack brothers had been framed for murder; 2,357 people signed a petition attesting to the brothers' innocence

The brothers were hanged on Thursday, 11 May 1858 outside Nenagh Prison.

Daniel Cormack addressed the crowd at the public execution from the scaffold, saying: "Lord have mercy on me, for you know, Jesus, that I neither had hand, act, nor part in that for which I am about to die. Good people, pray for me." According to a contemporary report, "the brother having made the same awful declaration, both were in the next moment launched into eternity".

Years later a tenant named Michael Gleeson, who had been evicted by Ellis, confessed to the murder.

In 1910 a committee was formed in Loughmore to exhume the brothers and rebury them in the churchyard. Daniel's and William's remains were ceremonially removed from Nenagh Gaol and brought back to Loughmore with two hearses drawn by plumed horses, followed by huge crowds. After the procession arrived in the village, the Cormack brothers were buried in a mausoleum in the churchyard where people still go to see the original oak coffins and the inscription proclaiming their innocence.

On one side of the mausoleum is inscribed:

Inscribed on the other side:

Sport

Loughmore–Castleiney GAA is the local Gaelic Athletic Association club and has traditionally been a Gaelic football club but also has a hurling team. The parish is known as a "football island" in mid-Tipperary as it is surrounded by clubs that play hurling only. In 2013, the parish won the Tipperary Senior Hurling Championship for the third time. Loughmore-Castleiney won the Munster Club Senior Hurling Championship in 2007. It has won the Tipperary Senior Football Championship 12 times, last winning it in 2013. Loughmore got the first double in the county by winning the senior hurling and football county finals in the same year.

Loughmore is the home of a number of sportspeople, including the All-Ireland Minor Football Championship winning captain Liam McGrath (2011) and two time GAA GPA All Stars Awards winner Noel McGrath. The club provided Jim Ryan and Bill Ryan (Laha) to the Tipperary team that played in Croke Park on Bloody Sunday against Dublin in November, 1920 when their playing colleague Michael Hogan of Grangemockler was one of 15 people shot and killed by British forces who fired on the crowd and team.

Notable people
John Cormack, hurler
John McGrath, hurler
Liam McGrath, hurler
Noel McGrath, hurler
Pat McGrath, hurler
John Meagher, hurler
Kathleen Nesbitt, award-winning fiddler.
Máiréad Nesbitt, violinist with Celtic Woman
Paul Ormond, hurler & Gaelic footballer
Nicholas Purcell, landlord & soldier
Thomas Purcell, landlord
Hanna Sheehy-Skeffington, feminist, suffragette, activist
Michéal Webster, hurler

See also
 List of towns and villages in Ireland

References

Towns and villages in County Tipperary
Eliogarty